Enoch Josiah "Joe" Mills (July 23, 1880 – October 3, 1935) was an American football, basketball, and baseball coach, college athletics administrator, author, naturalist, and hotelier. He served as the head football coach at Fort Worth University from 1904 to 1906, Baylor University from 1908 to 1909, and the University of Colorado Boulder from 1918 to 1919.

Early life and athletics career
Mills was born and raised on farm near Pleasanton, Kansas. He was the brother of Enos Mills, naturalist, author, and homesteader. Mills played college football at Colorado Agricultural College—now known as Colorado State University— from 1899 to 1901. He also played baseball at Colorado Agricultural as a center fielder in 1899 and 1901. Mills moved on to the University of Denver, quarterbacking the football team in 1903. He was elected captain for following season, but left for Fort Worth University in 1904, where he served as captain and coach of the football team. He remained as football coach at Fort Worth for the 1905 and 1906 seasons before leaving in 1907 for Polytechnic College—now known as Texas Wesleyan University—to serve as athletic director.

Mills married Ethel Steele, a former public school teacher in Fort Worth, Texas, on May 18, 1908.

Mills was hired as the athletic director at Baylor University in 1908. He was the eighth head football coach at Baylor University, serving for two seasons, from 1908 to 1909, and compiling a record of 8–8. He was also the second head basketball coach at Baylor, coaching two seasons, from 1908 to 1910, and tallying a mark of 19–10. In addition, he was the head baseball coach at Baylor in 1909, amassing a record of 9–12.

Later life, death, and honors
Mills worked as a reporter for the Fort Worth Telegram and operated a number of resort hotels in Colorado. He helped to establish Rocky Mountain National Park in north-central Colorado. Mills died on October 3, 1935, in Denver, Colorado, after suffering a skull fracture in an automobile crash six days earlier. Joe Mills Mountain near Estes Park, Colorado in Rocky Mountain National Park is named for him.

Head coaching record

Football

References

1880 births
1935 deaths
20th-century American journalists
American hoteliers
American football quarterbacks
American men's basketball players
American naturalists
Baseball outfielders
Player-coaches
Baylor Bears athletic directors
Baylor Bears baseball coaches
Baylor Bears football coaches
Baylor Bears men's basketball coaches
Colorado Buffaloes football coaches
Colorado Buffaloes men's basketball coaches
Colorado State Rams baseball players
Colorado State Rams football players
Colorado State Rams men's basketball players
Denver Pioneers football players
Texas Wesleyan Rams athletic directors
Texas Wesleyan Rams baseball coaches
Texas Wesleyan Rams men's basketball coaches
People from Estes Park, Colorado
People from Pleasanton, Kansas
Sportspeople from the Kansas City metropolitan area
Players of American football from Kansas
Coaches of American football from Kansas
Baseball coaches from Kansas
Baseball players from Kansas
Basketball coaches from Kansas
Basketball players from Kansas
Road incident deaths in Colorado